South Kent is a village located in Litchfield County, Connecticut, United States, alongside the border with New York, and within and part of Kent, Connecticut. South Kent has its own Post Office whose ZIP code is 06785. South Kent is also home to South Kent School, a private prep school.

Geography

South Kent is located in Litchfield County. South Kent's terrain is mostly hilly, with small valleys and upland plateaus. There are several bodies of water in South Kent, including Hatch Pond, Mill Pond, Mud Pond, and South Spectacle Lake.

Demographics
As of the census of 2000, there were 578 people living in the town, living in 224 households.  The average household size was 2.58 and the average family size was 2.99.

The median income for a household in the town was $60,208, and the median income for a family was $56,964. Males had a median income of $58,875 versus $34,135 for females. The per capita income for the town was $59,245.

Facts of note
South Kent, CT was home to artist Robert Nisbett (1879–1961).
Philip W. Camp, farmer and author of a series of books known as Phil Camp's Stories, was a lifelong resident.
South Kent is currently home to the oldest and largest herd of the rare Randall Cattle breed and the breed Registry.

References

External links
Town Website
South Kent School

Kent, Connecticut
Villages in Litchfield County, Connecticut
Villages in Connecticut